"Hickory Dickory Dock" or "Hickety Dickety Dock" is a popular English-language nursery rhyme. It has a Roud Folk Song Index number of 6489.

Lyrics and music
The most common modern version is:
Hickory dickory dock.
The mouse ran up the clock.
The clock struck one,
The mouse ran down,
Hickory dickory dock.

Hickory dickory dock.
The mouse ran up the clock.
The clock struck two,
The mouse ran down,
Hickory dickory dock.

Hickory dickory dock.
The mouse ran up the clock.
The clock struck three,
The mouse ran down,
Hickory dickory dock.

Hickory dickory dock.
The mouse ran up the clock.
The clock struck four,
The mouse ran down,
Hickory dickory dock.

Other variants include "down the mouse ran" or "down the mouse run" or "and down he ran" or "and down he run" in place of "the mouse ran down".

Score

Origins and meaning

The earliest recorded version of the rhyme is in Tommy Thumb's Pretty Song Book, published in London in about 1744, which uses the opening line: 'Hickere, Dickere Dock'. The next recorded version in Mother Goose's Melody (c. 1765), uses 'Dickery, Dickery Dock'.

The rhyme is thought by some commentators to have originated as a counting-out rhyme. Westmorland shepherds in the nineteenth century used the numbers Hevera (8), Devera (9) and Dick (10) which are from the language Cumbric.

The rhyme is thought to have been based on the astronomical clock at Exeter Cathedral. The clock has a small hole in the door below the face for the resident cat to hunt mice.

See also
Yan Tan Tethera
Chiastic structure
List of nursery rhymes
Hickory, Dickory, and Doc

References

External links
 
 

1744 songs
English children's songs
English folk songs
Songs about mice and rats
Fictional mice and rats
English nursery rhymes
Songwriter unknown
Traditional children's songs